El Juicio (The Judgment) is an album by Willie Colón & Héctor Lavoe issued in 1972 by Fania Records. It was the third of Colón and Lavoe's records to go gold, after Cosa Nuestra (1970), La Gran Fuga (1971), and before Lo Mato (1973).

Track listing
Ah-Ah/O-No	
Pirana	
Seguire Sin Ti	
Timbalero	
Aguanile	
Sonando Despierto	
Si La Ves	
Pan Y Agua (Bread & Water)

References

1972 albums
Willie Colón albums
Héctor Lavoe albums